Toremar (Toscana Regionale Marittima) is an Italian shipping company which operates in routes from Tuscany to the Tuscan archipelago.

On 3 November 2009 the Transport Minister Altero Matteoli and  the President of the Tuscany Region signed an agreement for the passage of the shipping company from the state to the region of Tuscany.

Fleet

Routes
Livorno↔Gorgona
Livorno↔Capraia
Piombino↔Portoferraio
Piombino↔Cavo
Piombino↔Rio Marina
Porto Santo Stefano↔Isola del Giglio

External links  

 Official website

Shipping companies of Italy
Ferry companies of Italy
Transport in Tuscany
Tirrenia Compagnia Italiana di Navigazione